The 1984 World Sportscar Championship season was the 32nd season of FIA "World Sportscar Championship" motor racing. It featured the 1984 FIA World Endurance Championship, which was open to FIA Group C1, Group C2 and Group B cars and to IMSA GTP, GTX, GTO and GTU cars. The championship was contested over an eleven race series which ran from 23 April to 2 December 1984.

The World Endurance Championship for Drivers was won by Stefan Bellof, the World Endurance Championship for Manufacturers by Porsche, the Group C2 Prototype FIA Cup by Alba Giannini, and the FIA Grand Touring Cup by BMW.

Schedule

The 1984 FIA World Endurance Championship was contested over an eleven race series.

† - The races at Brands Hatch, Imola and Sandown Park were qualifying rounds for the World Endurance Championship for Drivers but not for the three manufacturers awards.

Entries

Group C

Group C2

IMSA GTP

Results

Races
Race results for the 1984 FIA World Endurance Championship were as follows:

World Endurance Championship for Drivers

A total of 84 drivers were classified in the 1984 World Endurance Championship for Drivers.

Points were awarded to the top 10 finishers in each race on a 20-15-12-10-8-6-4-3-2-1 basis, with the following exceptions: 
 Drivers failing to drive the car for a prescribed minimum percentage of the laps in a race were not awarded points.
 Drivers were not awarded points if the car did not complete 90% of the distance covered by the race winning car.

Only the best eight scores for each driver counted towards the championship, with any other points being discarded.

World Endurance Championship for Manufacturers

Points were awarded to the top 10 finishers in the order of 20-15-12-10-8-6-4-3-2-1.

Manufacturers were awarded points only for their best placed car with no points awarded for places gained by any additional cars.

The chassis builder and engine builder of a competing car were considered as a single entity for classification purposes.

The races at Brands Hatch, Imola and Sandown Park were qualifying rounds for the World Endurance Championship for Drivers but not for the three manufacturers awards.

Only the best six scores for each manufacturer counted towards the championship, with any other points being discarded. Discarded points are shown with brackets.

In addition to competing for the World Endurance Championship for Manufacturers, Group C2 and Group B cars also competed for their own separate awards.

Group C2 Prototype FIA Cup

FIA Grand Touring Cup

References

 
World Sportscar Championship seasons
Sports